Numaegilina is a small genus of very small sea snails, pyramidellid gastropod mollusks or micromollusks. This genus is currently placed in the subfamily Chrysallidinae of the family Odostomiidae. It was originally described as a subgenus of  Chrysallida" but was raised to generic status by Schander et al. (1999).A junior synonym is Paregila Laseron, 1951.

Shell description
In the original description (Nomura, 1938) it is stated that the difference between this genus and "Egilina" and "Egila" is that the axial riblets are not fused at the upper and lower ends and that the sutures are not channeled.  There are spiral threads seen in the intercostae whereas the intercosta in Egilina are smooth.

Life history
Nothing is known about the biology of the members of this genus. As is true of most members of the Pyramidellidae sensu lato, they are most likely to be ectoparasites.

Species
Species within the genus Numaegilina include:
 Numaegilina gloria (Nomura, 1938) (Type species) (as Chrysallida (Numaegilina) gloria)
 Numaegilina claudoni (Dautzenberg & Fischer, 1906)
 Numaegilina henni 
 Numaegilina khmeriana Saurin, 1961
 Numaegilina obliquissima Saurin, 1959
 Numaegilina perspectiva 
 Numaegilina ventricosa'' (Saurin, 1958)

References
  Ronald G. Noseworthy, Na-Rae Lim, and Kwang-Sik Choi, A Catalogue of the Mollusks of Jeju Island, South Korea; Korean Journal of Malacology, Vol. 23(1): 65-104, June 30, 2007

External links 
 Numaegilina gloria (Nomura, 1938) - Picture

Pyramidellidae